İncirli is a neighbourhood in the Keçiören district of Ankara Province, Turkey. The Yunus Emre Avenue is the main road in the neighbourhood. It is bordered by Etlik, Aşağı Eğlence, Esertepe and Kuşcağız neighbourhoods within the same district.

Name 
The meaning of the name İncirli in Turkish is "(land) with figs". The area was once famous for fig trees.

References

External links 
 Administrative map of Keçiören district

Other uses 
 Turkish name for the Aegean, now Greek island Nisyros in the Cyclades

Keçiören
Neighbourhoods of Keçiören